The 1995–96 season was the 81st season of the Isthmian League, which is an English football competition featuring semi-professional and amateur clubs from London, East and South East England. The league consisted of four divisions.

Premier Division

The Premier Division consisted of 22 clubs, including 18 clubs from the previous season and four new clubs:
 Worthing, promoted as runners-up in Division One
 Boreham Wood, promoted as champions of Division One
 Chertsey Town, promoted as third in Division One
 Yeovil Town, relegated from the Football Conference

League table

Division One

Division One consisted of 22 clubs, including 15 clubs from the previous season and seven new clubs:

Three clubs relegated from the Premier Division:
 Chesham United
 Marlow
 Wokingham Town

Three clubs promoted from Division Two:
 Barton Rovers
 Oxford City
 Thame United

Plus:
 Leyton Pennant replaced Leyton, who merged with Walthamstow Pennant.

League table

Division Two

Division Two consisted of 21 clubs, including 16 clubs from the previous season and five new clubs:

Two clubs relegated from Division One:
 Wivenhoe Town
 Dorking

Three clubs promoted from Division Three:
 Canvey Island
 Collier Row
 Bedford Town

Division started the season one club short after Newbury Town folded. At the end of the season Saffron Walden Town resigned from the league due to ground grading problems and joined the Essex Senior League. Thus, no teams were relegated from the Second Division this season.

League table

Division Three

Division Three consisted of 21 clubs, including 17 clubs from the previous season and four new teams:

Two clubs relegated from Division Two:
 Aveley
 Windsor & Eton

Plus:
 Wealdstone, transferred from Southern League Southern Division
 Wingate & Finchley, promoted as runners-up in the South Midlands League

League table

See also
Isthmian League
1995–96 Northern Premier League
1995–96 Southern Football League

References

Isthmian League seasons
6